Somerset was an electoral district of the Legislative Assembly in the Australian state of Queensland from 1950 to 1992.

Its area was mostly inherited from the abolished district of Stanley, located in the upper Brisbane River valley. It was named after Lake Somerset.

Somerset was mostly a safe Country/National party seat, although was won by Labor in the 1953 election.

It was abolished in the 1991 redistribution, and its territory was distributed between the districts of Lockyer and Crows Nest.

Members for Somerset

Election results

See also
 Electoral districts of Queensland
 Members of the Queensland Legislative Assembly by year
 :Category:Members of the Queensland Legislative Assembly by name

References

Former electoral districts of Queensland
1950 establishments in Australia
1992 disestablishments in Australia
Constituencies established in 1950
Constituencies disestablished in 1992